The 1985–86 Old Dominion Monarchs men's basketball team represented Old Dominion University in the 1985–86 college basketball season. This was head coach Tom Young's 1st season at Old Dominion. The Monarchs competed in the Sun Belt Conference and played their home games at the ODU Fieldhouse. They finished the season 23–8, 11–3 in Sun Belt play to the regular season conference title. They lost in the semifinals of the 1986 Sun Belt Conference men's basketball tournament, but did earn an at-large bid to the NCAA tournament. As No. 8 seed in the East Region where they defeated No. 9 seed West Virginia in the opening round before losing to No. 1 seed and eventual National runner-up Duke in the round of 32.

Roster

Schedule and results

|-
!colspan=9 style=| Regular season

|-
!colspan=10 style=| Sun Belt tournament

|-
!colspan=10 style=| NCAA tournament

Awards and honors
Kenny Gattison – Sun Belt Player of the Year
Tom Young – Sun Belt co-Coach of the Year

NBA Draft

References

Old Dominion
Old Dominion Monarchs men's basketball seasons
Old Dominion
Old Dominion
Old Dominion